Jürgen Ludger Born (born 24 September 1940 in Berlin) is a German banker and the former chairman of the board of management of Werder Bremen.

References

German bankers
1940 births
Living people
Place of birth missing (living people)
SV Werder Bremen non-playing staff
20th-century German businesspeople